

Techniques by declarer 

trumping or ruffing and crossruffing
establishing a long suit
finessing
ducking
blocking and unblocking
managing entries
maintaining tempo
drawing trumps
not drawing trumps

Advanced techniques by declarer 
card reading, also known as counting the hand
dummy reversal
endplay
coups
squeezes
suit combinations play
safety play
applying the principle of restricted choice
applying the theory of vacant places
applying percentages and probabilities

Techniques by defenders 
 making the opening lead
 signaling
 unblocking
 overtaking
 holding up.

Contract bridge card play